Tsavo National Park may refer to:

 Tsavo East National Park, a national park in Kenya on the eastern side of the A109 road
 Tsavo West National Park, a national park in Kenya on the western side of the A109 road